The Daxing Line of the Beijing Subway is a rapid transit line that connects the southern Daxing District of the city with the subway network. It extends Line 4 south from its southern terminus at Gongyixiqiao, on the 4th Ring Road in Fengtai District, to Tian'gongyuan, beyond the 6th Ring Road in Daxing District. Initially, the Daxing line was planned to have 4 ground stations. However, due to lack of space, only Xihongmen was built above the surface. Full-scale construction began in 2007 and the line was opened on 30 December 2010, 14:00 local time.

Route and service
Though the Daxing Line is classified as a distinct line, the Beijing MTR Corporation Limited operates through-train service on Lines 4 and Daxing, making the two lines effectively one line for travelers. With the opening of the Daxing Line on 30 December 2010, the Beijing MTR Corporation Limited now runs two types of train service on the combined Line 4-Daxing Line route:
 A full-route service that covers the entire Line 4 and Daxing Lines. This train service runs from Anheqiao North, the northern terminus of Line 4, to Tian'gongyuan, the southern terminus of the Daxing Line.
 A partial-route service that covers the entire Line 4 route plus one stop on the Daxing Line. This service runs from Anheqiao North to Xin'gong, the northernmost stop on the Daxing Line. Travelers wishing to proceed further south on the Daxing Line would have to switch to a south-bound full-route train.

Service routes
  —  (through service via Line 4)
  —  (through service via Line 4)
 Rush hour (7:00-8:00):  —  (through service via Line 4)

Stations

History
1 June 2008: Construction began on Daxing Line.  Completion set for the end of 2011.
16 November 2008: Completion date moved up to 28 December 2010.
20 April 2010: Completion date moved again to 28 October 2010.
30 December 2010: Daxing Line opened.

Rolling Stock

Notes
a.  Line 4 ridership included. 
b. See  &  (English)

References

Beijing Subway lines
MTR Corporation
Railway lines opened in 2010
2010 establishments in China
750 V DC railway electrification